Pascin Point (‘Nos Pascin’ \'nos pas-'kin\) is the oval rocky point on the northwest coast of Livingston Island in Antarctica projecting 250 m north-northwestwards into Zornitsa Cove in Barclay Bay. It is named after the Bulgarian artist Jules Pascin (Julius Pincas, 1885-1930).

Location
British mapping in 1968, and Bulgarian in 2005, 2009 and 2017.

Maps
 L.L. Ivanov et al. Antarctica: Livingston Island and Greenwich Island, South Shetland Islands. Scale 1:100000 topographic map. Sofia: Antarctic Place-names Commission of Bulgaria, 2005.
 L.L. Ivanov. Antarctica: Livingston Island and Greenwich, Robert, Snow and Smith Islands. Scale 1:120000 topographic map. Troyan: Manfred Wörner Foundation, 2009.
 Antarctic Digital Database (ADD). Scale 1:250000 topographic map of Antarctica. Scientific Committee on Antarctic Research (SCAR). Since 1993, regularly upgraded and updated

References
 Bulgarian Antarctic Gazetteer. Antarctic Place-names Commission. (details in Bulgarian, basic data in English)
 Pascin Point. SCAR Composite Gazetteer of Antarctica

External links
 Pascin Point. Copernix satellite image

Headlands of Livingston Island
Bulgaria and the Antarctic